Crack in the World  is a 1965 American science-fiction doomsday disaster movie filmed in Spain.  It is about scientists who launch a nuclear missile into the Earth's crust, to release the geothermal energy of the magma below; but accidentally unleash a cataclysmic destruction that threatens to sever the earth in two.  It was released by Paramount Pictures on February 24, 1965.

Plot
An international consortium of scientists, operating as Project Inner Space in Tanganyika, Africa, is trying to tap into the Earth's geothermal energy by drilling a very deep hole down to the Earth's core. The scientists are foiled by an extremely dense layer of material. To penetrate the barrier and reach the magma below, they intend to detonate an atomic device at the bottom of the hole.

The leader of the project, Dr. Stephen Sorenson (Dana Andrews), who is secretly dying of cancer, believes that the atomic device will burn its way through the barrier, but the project's chief geologist, Dr. Ted Rampion (Kieron Moore), is convinced that the lower layers of the crust have been weakened by decades of underground nuclear tests, and that the detonation could produce a massive crack which would threaten the very existence of Earth.

The atomic device is used and Rampion's fears prove justified, as the crust of the Earth develops an enormous crack that progresses rapidly along a fault line, causing earthquakes and tsunamis along its path. Rampion warns a committee of world leaders that the crack is capable of extending beyond the fault, and that if it were to encircle the Earth, causing the land masses to split, the oceans would be sucked in, generating steam at high enough of a pressure to rip the Earth apart.

Sorenson meanwhile discovers that there was a huge reservoir of hydrogen underground, which turned the small conventional atomic explosion into a huge thermonuclear one that was millions of times more powerful. Another atomic device, lowered into the magma chamber of an island volcano in the path of the crack, is used in the hope of stopping the crack, but it only reverses the crack's direction. Eventually, the crack approaches its starting point at the test site, and a huge chunk of the planet outlined by the crack is expected to be thrown out into space. Sorenson remains at the underground control center to record the event, despite pleas by his wife Maggie to evacuate with the rest of the project staff. She and Rampion barely escape the test site in time to observe the fiery birth of a second moon. Its release stops the crack, and the Earth survives.

Cast
 Dana Andrews as Dr. Stephen Sorensen
 Janette Scott as Dr. Maggie Sorensen
 Kieron Moore as Dr. Ted Rampion
 Alexander Knox as Sir Charles Eggerston

Production
Shooting took place in and around Madrid, which was chosen for its lower production costs.  Production lasted about seven weeks.  The film's technical adviser was producer Glasser's neighbor, a geologist.

Reception
Variety wrote that it was more believable than the usual science fiction premise and praised its special effects.  Howard Thompson of The New York Times called it "the best science-fiction thriller this year".  Time Out London called it "awesomely credible" and described the ending's imagery as disturbing.

See also
 List of American films of 1965
 Dante's Peak
 The Core

References

External links
 
 
 

1965 films
1960s science fiction films
1960s disaster films
American disaster films
Apocalyptic films
Paramount Pictures films
Films shot in Spain
Films directed by Andrew Marton
Films set in London
Films set in Tanganyika
Films scored by Johnny Douglas
1960s English-language films
1960s American films